The Kirchhoff–Helmholtz integral combines the Helmholtz equation with the Kirchhoff integral theorem to produce a method applicable to acoustics, seismology and other disciplines involving wave propagation.

It states that the sound pressure is completely determined within a volume free of sources, if sound pressure and velocity are determined in all points on its surface.

See also
Kirchhoff integral

References

Acoustic equations